Christos Kagiouzis (born 23 February 1981) is a German footballer of Greek origins. He is a defensive midfielder who plays for Veria F.C. in the Football League (Greece).

Career
Born in Offenbach, Germany, Kagiouzis began his career with local side Kickers Offenbach.

External links
 Football-Lineups.com

Profile at epae.org
Profile at Onsports.gr

1981 births
Living people
Greek footballers
German footballers
Greek expatriate footballers
Kickers Offenbach players
Xanthi F.C. players
Kastoria F.C. players
A.O. Kerkyra players
Kavala F.C. players
Ethnikos Asteras F.C. players
Veria F.C. players
Association football midfielders
Sportspeople from Offenbach am Main
Footballers from Hesse